Port Orford (Tolowa: tr’ee-ghi~’- ’an’ ) is a city in Curry County on the southern coast of Oregon, United States. The population was 1,133 at the 2010 census.

The city takes its name from George Vancouver's original name for nearby Cape Blanco, which he named for George, Earl of Orford, "a much-respected friend."

Port Orford is the westernmost settlement in the state of Oregon, and the westernmost incorporated place in the 48 contiguous states.

History

Before the arrival of European settlers, the Port Orford area was inhabited by Tututni peoples. The Tututni languages were a part of the Pacific Coast Athabaskan language family.

Spanish explorer Bartoleme Ferrelo mapped Cape Blanco in 1543. It remained the farthest north point on the coastal map until 1778. Captain George Vancouver sighted land and named it Port Orford in 1792. In June 1851 Captain William Tichenor in command of the Seagull pulled into Port Orford, leaving behind nine men. Fort Orford, a U.S. Army fort, was established 14 Sep 1851 near the town and lasted until 22 Aug 1856.

In October 1941, then-mayor Gilbert Gable, frustrated with the poor condition of the state roads around Port Orford, which hampered economic development, suggested that a number of counties along the Oregon and California state border should secede and create the State of Jefferson. This movement came to an end with U.S. involvement in World War II.

Geography
At 124 degrees, 29 minutes, 53 seconds west longitude, it is the westernmost city in the contiguous United States, though in Clallam County, Washington, there are three unincorporated communities that are farther west than Port Orford: Neah Bay, La Push, and Ozette.

Climate
Port Orford has an oceanic climate (Csb according to the Köppen climate classification system) with cool, very wet winters and mild, dry summers. It is at the northern end of Oregon's "banana belt", a region with relatively warm weather caused by the Brookings effect. Its hardiness zone is 9b.

Demographics

2010 census
As of the census of 2010, there were 1,133 people, 603 households, and 285 families residing in the city. The racial makeup of the city was 93.3% White, 0.6% African American, 1.4% Native American, 0.5% Asian, 0.9% from other races, and 3.3% from two or more races. Hispanic or Latino of any race were 4.3% of the population.

There were 603 households, of which 11.8% had children under the age of 18 living with them, 35.3% were married couples living together, 8.8% had a female householder with no husband present, 3.2% had a male householder with no wife present, and 52.7% were non-families. 43.4% of all households were made up of individuals, and 15.6% had someone living alone who was 65 years of age or older. The average household size was 1.86 and the average family size was 2.47.

The median age in the city was 54.7 years. 11.8% of residents were under the age of 18; 6.6% were between the ages of 18 and 24; 16.3% were from 25 to 44; 36.7% were from 45 to 64; and 28.8% were 65 years of age or older. The gender makeup of the city was 48.0% male and 52.0% female.

2000 census
As of the census of 2000, there were 1,153 people, 571 households, and 311 families residing in the city. The population density was 719.1 people per square mile (278.2/km). There were 662 housing units at an average density of 412.9 per square mile (159.7/km). The racial makeup of the city was 95.40% White, 0.09% African American, 1.39% Native American, 0.26% Asian, 0.17% Pacific Islander, 0.87% from other races, and 1.82% from two or more races. Hispanic or Latino of any race were 2.60% of the population.

There were 571 households, out of which 19.6% had children under the age of 18 living with them, 44.0% were married couples living together, 9% had a female householder with no husband present, and 45% were non-families. 39% of all households were made up of individuals, and 18.2% had someone living alone who was 65 years of age or older. The average household size was 2 people and the average family size was 2.66.

In the city, the population was spread out, with 18.8% under the age of 18, 3.4% from 18 to 24, 19.7% from 25 to 44, 30.8% from 45 to 64, and 27.3% who were 65 years of age or older. The median age was 50 years. For every 100 females, there were 92.2 males.

The median income for a household in the city was $23,289, and the median income for a family was $29,653. Males had a median income of $35,221 versus $15,179 for females. The per capita income for the city was $16,442. About 16.1% of families and 17.8% of the population were below the poverty line, including 21.9% of those under age 18 and 9.2% of those age 65 or over.

Education
The city is served by the Port Orford-Langlois School District, which includes Driftwood Elementary School, and Pacific High School.

Media
 KDPO-FM 91.9 Radio, repeater station to KDOV-FM of Medford, Oregon

Notable people
Samuel Colver (1817–1891), settler
Gilbert Gable (1886-1941), politician
Richard T. Drinnon (1925–2012), historian
Nick Reynolds (1933–2008), musician
David Brock Smith, politician
Hanneke Cassel (1978- ), folk violinist

See also
Orford Reef
Port Orford meteorite hoax

References

External links
 Official site
 Entry for Port Orford in the Oregon Blue Book
 
 wikisource:en:Oregon Historical Quarterly/Volume 25/Address by Binger Hermann

 
Cities in Oregon
Populated coastal places in Oregon
Cities in Curry County, Oregon
Port cities in Oregon
1856 establishments in Oregon Territory
Populated places established in 1856
Tututni